Silas Creek Parkway is a route in Winston-Salem, North Carolina. The road is designed as a partial loop around several neighborhoods, from northwestern Winston-Salem, to the southeast area of the city. The route is an expressway as it has grade-separated interchanges and is a popular connector to Interstate 40 and US 421 to other locations in the city such as Wake Forest University, Hanes Mall, and the LJVM Coliseum. The route also has several at-grade intersections with major arterial thoroughfares especially in the southeast section which in which that stretch of the route uses a boulevard grade, giving more direct accesses to several commercial districts.

Route description
The route starts at an intersection with Main Street. The road then passes an access road to Intestate 40 that gives only access to eastbound before it enters into a commercially developed area. The road passes an intersection with Peters Creek Parkway (NC 150) where NC 67 now overlaps with the road. It then passes the Forsyth Tech campus before leaving the busy district where the road then meets Bolton Street at a folded diamond interchange, where the road upgrades to an expressway. The road passes Hanes Mall Boulevard in a busy shopping district and the Forsyth Medical Center. The road then passes the Stratford Road (US 158) and the Salem Parkway (US 421) exits. The road continues north as it passes the Country Club Road interchange. Shortly after, it passes an exit with Robinhood Road. The road then passes a residential area to the east. The road than heads towards the Wake Forest University campus coming to  an exit with Reynolda Road which in which NC 67 leaves the road heading west towards Yadkin County also giving access to the campus. At this point the road's speed limit increases to 50 MPH speed limit passing very few at-grade intersections for the next 1.6 miles before the route meets at an intersection with Bethabara Road. From here, the road continues as North Point Boulevard.

History

Initial plans
In 1946, the Silas Creek Parkway was first proposed. The highway was initially constructed to go from Robinhood Road to what is now Reynolds Boulevard. There were among other changes in routing before 1956 when it was finalized.

Early Construction
On October 5, 1959, the North Carolina Department of Transportation (known as the State Highway Commission at the time) approved spending $500,000 to build a partial loop on the outskirts of Winston-Salem. It would run between the what was then the new Forsyth Memorial Hospital and the Western Electric Company plant at Reynolda Road. The parkway would be ushering in suburban development on the western side of the city and pushing the city's borders west. The parkway opened on November 4, 1961. In 1963, there were major changes to the route, the parkway was being widened to four lanes all along its route and the at grade intersections at Stratford Road and Robinhood Road were reutilized to grade-separated interchanges improving congestion along its route. In 1968, the Bolton Street intersection was also reutilized to an interchange.

Extensions and reroutings
During the 1980s, there were several major changes to the route. In 1988, Corporation Parkway which was a route in the city became an extension of Silas Creek Parkway. Also, there was an area plan The Polo Road-Reynolda Road Area Plan, prepared by the City-County Planning Board was adopted by the city-County Planning Board and the Winston-Salem Board of Winston-Salem Board of Aldermen following a public hearing. There was an endorsement of a new bypass of the Wake Forest University campus and areas surrounding the campus. Silas Creek Parkway adopted the 1983 study, which was planned to be finished between 1991 to 1993. 
The bypass was completed in 1992 as a 1.7 mile partial controlled access highway and an extension of Silas Creek Parkway. Unlike the rest of the road, the extension uses the 50 MPH speed limit with new overpasses that carry Reynolda Road and Polo Road. On the extension, a new extension of Fairlawn Drive was built connecting the new extension with Reynolda Road giving drivers access to and from Reynolda Road from the new highway. The former northern terminus at Reynolda Road was turned into Y-Junction, using the name Wake Forest Road. Junction signs to Reynolda Road were installed southbound at Fairlawn Drive and in both directions at Wake Forest Road. In 1995, NC 67 was rerouted from going through downtown to going onto Silas Creek Parkway between the junctions at Reynolda Road to Peters Creek Parkway (NC 150)

Major junctions

References

Transportation in Winston-Salem, North Carolina
Expressways in North Carolina
Transportation in Forsyth County, North Carolina